1-Octacosanol (also known as n-octacosanol, octacosyl alcohol, cluytyl alcohol, montanyl alcohol) is a straight-chain aliphatic 28-carbon primary fatty alcohol that is common in the epicuticular waxes of plants, including the leaves of many species of Eucalyptus, of most forage and cereal grasses, of Acacia, Trifolium, Pisum and many other legume genera among many others, sometimes as the major wax constituent. Octacosanol also occurs in wheat germ.

Chemistry
Octacosanol is insoluble in water but freely soluble in low molecular-weight alkanes and in chloroform.

Biological effects
Octacosanol is the main component in the mixture policosanol. Octacosanol has been subject to preliminary study for its potential benefit for patients with Parkinson's disease. Studies have also found that octacosanol may inhibit the production of cholesterol. In mice, octacosanol reduces stress and restores stress-affected sleep back to normal.

References

Fatty alcohols
Primary alcohols
Alkanols